NBV may refer to:

 North Bay Village, a city located in Miami-Dade County, Florida
 Nurses Board of Victoria
 Net Book Value in accounting
 National Bank of Vanuatu